Damir Maričić (born 8 February 1959) is a former professional Croatian footballer.

Club career
Maričić won the 1978–79 Yugoslav First League with HNK Hajduk Split before moving to Germany, playing in the 2. Fußball-Bundesliga for Tennis Borussia Berlin and later finishing his playing career in Switzerland for BSC Old Boys.

References

External links
 

1959 births
Living people
Association football forwards
Yugoslav footballers
HNK Hajduk Split players
NK Zagreb players
GNK Dinamo Zagreb players
Tennis Borussia Berlin players
Freiburger FC players
1. FC Pforzheim players
Offenburger FV players
BSC Old Boys players
Yugoslav First League players
2. Bundesliga players
Yugoslav expatriate footballers
Expatriate footballers in West Germany
Yugoslav expatriate sportspeople in West Germany
Expatriate footballers in Switzerland
Yugoslav expatriate sportspeople in Austria